La Joya (Spanish: "The Jewel") may refer to:

United States
 La Joya, Texas, a city
 La Joya, New Mexico
 La Jolla, San Diego, California, a seaside community
 La Joya, California, former name of Green Valley, Los Angeles County, California
 La Joya Community High School, a school located in Avondale, Arizona

Mexico
 La Joya, Baja California, a city in the state of Baja California
 , a town in the state of Morelos
 La Joya (archaeological site), in Veracruz 
 La Joya (Mexico City Metrobús), a BRT station in Mexico City

Peru
 La Joya District, a district in Arequipa Province, Arequipa Region

Footballer 
 Paulo Dybala, an Argentine footballer